The Friday Film Special was a slot for children on the UK television network BBC1, shown between 1985 and 1989.

Every Friday during each season, they showed a children's film, made by the Children's Film Foundation. The films were mostly from the 1970s and 1980s, with some from the 1960s.

Here is a list of some of the films that were screened:

 Sammy's Super T-Shirt (1978)
 4-D Special Agent (1981)
 Tightrope to Terror (1982)
 Cry Wolf (1968)
 Fern the Red Deer (1976)
 Paganini Strikes Again (1973)
 A Hitch in Time (1978)
 Sky Pirates (1976)
 One Hour to Zero (1976)
 Haunters of The Deep (1984)
 The Boy Who Turned Yellow (1972)
 The Glitterball (1977)

References

External links

BBC children's television shows
1985 British television series debuts
1989 British television series endings
Children's Film Foundation